A gully is a landform created by running water, mass movement, or commonly a combination of both eroding sharply into soil or other relatively erodible material, typically on a hillside or in river floodplains or terraces. Gullies resemble large ditches or small valleys, but are metres to tens of metres in depth and width and are characterised by a distinct 'headscarp' or 'headwall' and progress by headward (i.e. upstream) erosion.  Gullies are commonly related to intermittent or ephemeral water flow usually associated with localised intense or protracted rainfall events, or snowmelt. Gullies can be formed and accelerated by cultivation practices on hillslopes (often gentle gradient) in farmland, and they can develop rapidly in rangelands from existing natural erosion forms subject to vegetative cover removal and livestock activity.

Etymology
The earliest known usage of the term is from 1657. It originates from the French word goulet, a diminutive form of goule which means throat. It is possible that the term is connected to the name of a type of knife used at the time, a gully-knife.

Formation and consequences 
Gully erosion can progress through a variety and combination of processes. The erosion processes include incision and bank erosion by water flow, mass movement of saturated or unsaturated bank or wall material, groundwater seepage - sapping the overlying material, collapse of soil pipes or tunnels in dispersive soils, or a combination of these to a greater or lesser degree.  Hillsides are more prone to gully erosion when they are cleared of vegetation cover, through deforestation, over-grazing or other means. Gullies in rangelands can be initiated by concentrated water flow down tracks worn by livestock or vehicle tracks. The eroded soil is easily carried by the flowing water after being dislodged from the ground, normally when rainfall falls during short, intense storms such as during thunderstorms.

A gully may grow in length by means of headward (i.e. upstream) erosion at a knick point. This erosion can result from interflow and soil piping (internal erosion) as well as surface runoff. Gully erosion may also advance laterally by similar methods, including mass movement, acting on the gully walls (banks) and by developing 'branches' (a type of tributary).

Gullies reduce the productivity of farmlands where they incise into the land, and produce sediment that may choke downstream waterbodies, and reduce water quality within the drainage system and lake or coastal system.  Because of this, much effort is invested into the study of gullies within the scope of geomorphology and soil science, in the prevention of gully erosion, and in remediation and rehabilitation of gullied landscapes.  The total soil loss from gully formation and subsequent downstream river sedimentation can be substantial, especially from unstable soil materials prone to dispersion.

Artificial gullies 
Gullies can be formed or enlarged by a number of human activities.

Artificial gullies are formed during hydraulic mining when jets or streams of water are projected onto soft alluvial deposits to extract gold or tin ore. The remains of such mining methods are very visible landform features in old goldfields such as in California and northern Spain. The badlands at Las Medulas for example, were created during the Roman period by hushing or hydraulic mining of the gold-rich alluvium with water supplied by numerous aqueducts tapping nearby rivers. Each aqueduct produced large gullies below by erosion of the soft deposits. The effluvium was carefully washed with smaller streams of water to extract the nuggets and gold dust.

On Mars

Gullies are widespread at mid- to high latitudes on the surface of Mars, and are some of the youngest features observed on that planet, probably forming within the last few 100,000 years. There, they are one of the best lines of evidence for the presence of liquid water on Mars in the recent geological past, probably resulting from the slight melting of snowpacks on the surface or ice in the shallow subsurface on the warmest days of the Martian year. Flow as springs from deeper seated liquid water aquifers in the deeper subsurface is also a possible explanation for the formation of some Martian gullies.

Gallery

See also

 
 
 
  – a narrow gully with a steep gradient in a mountainous terrain
 
 
 
 
  - gully in Scotland or Northern England in rock
 
  – a shallow channel cut into soil by erosion from flowing water
 Terrace Crossing - a geographical zone between the sedimentation (downstream) part and the erosion (upstream) part of a river

References
 Oxford English Dictionary

External links 

Environmental soil science
Slope landforms
Fluvial landforms
Erosion landforms
Canyons and gorges
Soil erosion
Valleys
Soil landforms